Krumbach was a district in Swabia, Bavaria, Germany, before the regional reorganization in 1972. Krumbach was the capital of this district. The licence plate code was KRU.

The district had 49 municipalities. The largest of them were the towns Krumbach, Bavaria and Thannhausen and the municipalities Ziemetshausen, Neuburg an der Kammel and Ursberg.

It was bounded by (from the north and clockwise) the districts of Günzburg, Augsburg, Schwabmünchen, Mindelheim, Illertissen and Neu-Ulm. 

In 1972 the district was merged with Günzburg (district) and the urban district Günzburg to Günzburg district in today's borders.

Towns and municipalities of the district in the year 1970 

Towns
Krumbach 
Thannhausen

Market Towns
Münsterhausen
Neuburg an der Kammel
Niederraunau, today: part of the town Krumbach
Ziemetshausen

Municipalities
1. Aichen
2. Aletshausen
3. Attenhausen, today: part of the town Krumbach
4. Balzhausen
5. Bayersried-Ursberg, today the name of the municipality is Ursberg
6. Behlingen, today: part of the municipality Kammeltal
7. Billenhausen, today: part of the town Krumbach
8  Breitenthal
9. Burg, today: part of the town Thannhausen
10. Deisenhausen
11. Ebershausen
12. Edelstetten, today: part of the market town Neuburg an der Kammel
13. Edenhausen, today: part of the town Krumbach

See also 
 Synagogues of the Swabian type (Hürben, Krumbach)

References 

Former districts of Bavaria
Günzburg (district)